The Roman Catholic Diocese of Juína is a diocese located in the city of Juína in the Ecclesiastical province of Cuiabá in Brazil.

History
 December 23, 1997: Established as Diocese of Juína from the Diocese of Diamantino and Diocese of Ji-Paraná

Leadership
 Bishops of Juína (Roman rite)
 Bishop Franco Dalla Valle, S.D.B. (1997.12.23 – 2007.08.02)
 Archbishop Mílton Antônio dos Santos, S.D.B. (Apostolic Administrator 2007.08 – 2009.02.15)
 Bishop Neri José Tondello (2009.02.15 - present)

References
 GCatholic.org
 Catholic Hierarchy
 Diocese website (Portuguese)

Roman Catholic dioceses in Brazil
Christian organizations established in 1997
Juína, Roman Catholic Diocese of
Roman Catholic dioceses and prelatures established in the 20th century